Hollywood is a neighborhood of Ruidoso, in Lincoln County, New Mexico, United States and is part of the Lincoln National Forest.  It is a small community on U.S. Route 70, between Ruidoso Downs and the central part of the village of Ruidoso.

First postmaster was George A. Freidenbloom. The town was originally named after Hollywood, Florida. A post office (established 1926) as well as several homes and a few major hotels and retail outlets are what make up the city of Hollywood, New Mexico.

Transportation

Airports
 Sierra Blanca Regional Airport, located about 21 miles northwest of Hollywood.

Major highways
 U.S. Route 70
 NM 48

Nearest cities
 Ruidoso, New Mexico
 Ruidoso Downs, New Mexico
 Alto, New Mexico
 Tularosa, New Mexico
 Mescalero, New Mexico
 Bent, New Mexico
 Alamogordo, New Mexico
 Lincoln, New Mexico
 Capitan, New Mexico
 Cloudcroft, New Mexico
 Carrizozo, New Mexico
 Mayhill, New Mexico
 Roswell, New Mexico
 Las Cruces, New Mexico
 El Paso, Texas

References

External links
Ghost Town

Geography of Lincoln County, New Mexico